Uriah Y. Kim is a Korean-born American Old Testament scholar working as president of the Graduate Theological Union and John Dillenberger Professor of Biblical Studies.

Early life and education 
Born into a Buddhist home in South Korea, Kim moved to the United States when he was ten years old and became a Christian as a teenager. He completed his Bachelor of Arts degree from New York University, Master of Divinity from Princeton Theological Seminary, Master of Theology from the Candler School of Theology, and PhD from the Graduate Theological Union in May 2004.

Career 
Kim taught Hebrew Bible at Hartford Seminary (2005–2016), where he became a full professor and served as academic dean.

Since January 2017, Kim has been core doctoral faculty and John Dillenberger Professor of Biblical Studies at the Graduate Theological Union. In August 2020, he was named ninth President of the Graduate Theological Union.

His research and teaching interests include Deuteronomistic History, History of Ancient Israel, Postcolonial Biblical Criticism, Asian-American Biblical Hermeneutics, King David, and the Book of Judges.

Works 
 
 
 Kim, Uriah Y. (2011) “Where is the Home for the Man of Luz?”  Interpretation.
 Kim, Uriah Y. (2013) “The Politics of Othering in North America and in the Book of Judges,” Concilium.
 Kim, Uriah Y. (2014). Reading a Tendentious Bible: Essays in Honor of Robert B. Coote, Co-editor, Sheffield Phoenix Press. ISBN 978-1907534935.
 Kim, Uriah Y. (2014). “More to the Eye than Meets the Eye:  A Protest against the Empire in Samson’s Death,” Biblical Interpretation.

References 

Living people
American people of Korean descent
American biblical scholars
Old Testament scholars
New York University alumni
Princeton Theological Seminary alumni
Candler School of Theology alumni
Graduate Theological Union alumni
Year of birth missing (living people)